George Barrow (25 September 1921 – 20 March 2013) was an American jazz saxophonist who played both tenor and baritone saxes.

Self-taught on the saxophone, flute and clarinet, by the mid-1950s, he was playing in different line-ups led by Charles Mingus, including the Quintet (with Eddie Bert, Mal Waldron and Max Roach) before going on to join line-ups led by Ernie Wilkins, including the Ernie Wilkins-Kenny Clarke Septet and the Ernie Wilkins Orchestra, as well as with Oliver Nelson, notably on the classic album The Blues and the Abstract Truth.

Discography

As leader
The Amram-Barrow Quartet – with David Amram

As sideman
With Kenny Clarke and Ernie Wilkins
Kenny Clarke & Ernie Wilkins (Savoy, 1955)
With Charles Mingus
The Moods of Mingus (Savoy, 1955)
Mingus at the Bohemia (Debut, 1955)
The Charles Mingus Quintet & Max Roach (Debut, 1955)

With Teddy Charles
The Teddy Charles Tentet (Atlantic, 1956)
Word from Bird (Atlantic, 1957)

With The Three Playmates
The Three Playmates (Savoy, 1957)

With Eddie "Lockjaw" Davis
Trane Whistle (Prestige, 1960)

With Oliver Nelson
The Blues and the Abstract Truth (Impulse, 1961)

With Gene Ammons
Soul Summit Vol. 2 (Prestige, 1962)
Late Hour Special (Prestige, 1964)
Velvet Soul (Prestige, 1964)

With Jimmy Forrest
Soul Street (New Jazz, 1962)

With Etta Jones
From the Heart (Prestige, 1962)

With Jimmy Smith
Bashin': The Unpredictable Jimmy Smith (Verve, 1962)

With Clark Terry 
Clark Terry Plays the Jazz Version of All American (Moodsville, 1962)

With Frank Wess
Southern Comfort (Prestige, 1962)

With Bill Dixon
Bill Dixon 7-tette/Archie Shepp and the New York Contemporary 5 (Savoy, 1964)

With Bobby Timmons
Got to Get It! (Milestone, 1967)

With The Jazz Composer's Orchestra
The Jazz Composer's Orchestra (ECM, 1968)

With Melvin Van Peebles
Ain't Supposed to Die a Natural Death (A&M, 1971)
With Jimmy Owens
Headin' Home (A&M/Horizon, 1978)

References

1921 births
2013 deaths
Musicians from New York (state)
American jazz tenor saxophonists
American male saxophonists
American jazz baritone saxophonists
American male jazz musicians
20th-century American saxophonists